Elin Rodum Agdestein (born 10 August 1957) is a Norwegian politician for the Conservative Party. She was elected to the Parliament of Norway from Nord-Trøndelag in 2013 where she is member of the Standing Committee on Foreign Affairs and Defence.

References 

Conservative Party (Norway) politicians
Members of the Storting
Politicians from Nord-Trøndelag
1957 births
Living people
21st-century Norwegian politicians
21st-century Norwegian women politicians
Women members of the Storting